Rat & Boa is an online women's clothing retailer with headquarters in Newcastle, UK. Co-founded by friends Valentina Muntoni and Stephanie Cara Bennett in 2015, the company has attained near cult status, following a series of celebrity customers discovering their products via social media.

History 
Valentina Muntoni and Stephanie Cara Bennett met in 2008 at university in Manchester, where they were studying fashion degrees. They both quit their jobs to travel and started the company shortly after.

The name ‘Rat and Boa’ is derived from a Stevie Nicks quote about her and bandmate Lindsey Buckingham's relationship, "He and I were about as compatible as a rat and a boa constrictor". Stephanie Cara Bennett stated during an interview with Italian Vogue, "The Rat and the Boa both represent different elements of the brand and the varying qualities and personalities that we both bring". The brand's name represents the "grungy, edgy element" and the "Bohemian spirit". The co-founders explained that photographers from the 1990s, such as Steven Meisel, Sante D’Orazio and Ferdinando Scianna inspire their designs.

The brand gained significant exposure in 2016, after Kendall Jenner was spotted wearing a pair of shorts designed by Rat and Boa at the Coachella festival. Since then, a number of high-profile celebrities have been spotted wearing items from the range – these include Emily Ratajkowski, Adwoa Aboah, Alice Dellal, Kylie Jenner, Bella Hadid, Gigi Hadid, Olivia Culpo, Rosie Huntington Whiteley, Imaan Hammam & Gizele Olivera.

The co-founders announced in March 2019 that a series of pop up shops would be launched, starting with London.

In April 2019, The Independent included Rat and Boa in their list of the ‘Best Online Clothes Shops’ list.

Controversy 
Co-founder Valentina Muntoni features as the model in all the product shots, in one such product shot for the "Christy Skirt" (a black leather skirt with zips) Valentina exposed a nipple which drew the attention of the ASA. The ruling was upheld, with the ASA stating the image was "gratuitous and sexually provocative".

References

External links 
Official Website https://www.ratandboa.com

Instagram http://instagram.com/ratandboa

Online retailers of the United Kingdom
British companies established in 2015
Retail companies established in 2015
Internet properties established in 2015
Companies based in London
Clothing retailers of the United Kingdom
Clothing brands of the United Kingdom
2010s fashion